Yet-Ming Chiang (April 25, 1958) is a Taiwanese American materials scientist and engineer currently the Kyocera Professor at Massachusetts Institute of Technology. He has been influential in the development of new materials for energy storage, transfer, and power of a variety of different devices and vehicles.

Chiang was elected a member of the National Academy of Engineering in 2009 for contributions to understanding of new energy storage materials and their commercialization.

Background and Career 
Chiang was born in Taiwan, Republic of China, in 1958, and emigrated to the United States in 1964. His SB and Sc.D. degrees, 1980 and 1985 respectively, are both from MIT.

He is the author of over 200 peer-reviewed publications and holds over 30 patents.

Chiang was the postdoctoral advisor for L'Oreal Awardee Dorthe Ravnsbæk.

Entrepreneurship 
Chiang has founded or provides expert consultation to a number of companies in the materials and energy storage spaces, including:

 Form Energy - Iron-Air battery
A123 Systems - automotive Lithium-ion battery maker, based out of Hangzhou, China and Livonia, Michigan.
 Desktop Metal - 3D printing of metal components
 24M - Cambridge, Massachusetts start-up investigating battery technology for planes and other aircraft
 American Superconductor - superconducting materials

Awards 

 2009 - Elected to U.S. National Academy of Engineering 
 2006 - R&D 100 Award
 2001 - Ross Coffin Purdy Award of the Ceramics Society
 Fellow of the American Ceramic Society

References

MIT School of Engineering faculty
American materials scientists
American people of Taiwanese descent
21st-century American engineers
Living people
1958 births
Taiwanese scientists
Members of the United States National Academy of Engineering
Fellows of the American Ceramic Society
MIT School of Engineering alumni